Nansy Damianova (born March 30, 1991 in Sèvres, France) is a Canadian artistic gymnast. She represented Canada at the 2008 Summer Olympics.

External links
 
 Gymnastics Canada profile

1991 births
Living people
Canadian female artistic gymnasts
Canadian people of Bulgarian descent
Naturalized citizens of Canada
Francophone Quebec people
Gymnasts from Montreal
Olympic gymnasts of Canada
Gymnasts at the 2008 Summer Olympics
People from Sèvres
French female artistic gymnasts
Sportspeople from Hauts-de-Seine